The Long Beach Convention and Entertainment Center is a convention center located in Long Beach, California. Built on the former site of the Long Beach Municipal Auditorium, the venue is composed of the Long Beach Convention Center, Long Beach Arena, and the Long Beach Performing Arts Center. It is served by the 1st Street station of Los Angeles Metro Rail.

Venues
Long Beach Convention Center
Exhibit Hall A/B/C - Meeting Rooms include 101–104, 201-204 and Seaside Rooms
Promenade Ballroom (part of the 100 series meeting rooms) - 13,200 square feet 
Top of the Lot – an open air parking structure, composed at the upper deck of the Terrace Parking Lot
Grand Ballroom – 20,456 square feet 
Terrace Plaza
The Cove

Long Beach Arena
Long Beach Arena – opened in 1962, connected to the original Long Beach Municipal Auditorium. The auditorium was demolished in 1975 to make way for the convention center. 
Pacific Ballroom – an event space within the Long Beach Arena. A flying steel truss system converts the arena floor into an intimate space for receptions and concerts. For concerts, the venue can seat 2,990–4,890. It was originally known as the "Pacific Ballroom".

Long Beach Performing Arts Center
Terrace Theater
Beverly O'Neill Theater

Long Beach Convention Center 
During the COVID-19 pandemic in California, the convention center was used as a mass vaccination site. Later in the pandemic, the convention center was used as an emergency shelter for migrant children.

Long Beach Arena

Long Beach Arena was the first building to be completed in the complex. Capacities are as follows: 12,500 for hockey, 14,000 for basketball and 10,500 - 14,500 for concerts, depending on the seating arrangement.

The arena has hosted various entertainment and professional and college sporting events, most notably the volleyball events of the 1984 Summer Olympic Games.

For trade shows, the arena features 46,000 square feet (4300 m2) of space, with an additional 19,000 square feet (1800 m2) of space in the lobby and 29,000 square feet (2700 m2) in the concourse. Hanging from the arena's 77 foot (23 m) high ceiling is a center-hung scoreboard with four White Way "Mega Color" Animation Screens. There is an 11 by 15 foot SACO Smartvision LED Wall located on the south end of the arena.

The arena was the site of the first NHL game involving a 1967 expansion team, as the Los Angeles Kings and the Philadelphia Flyers, both expansion teams, played on October 14, 1967, the Kings won 4–2. The Kings played in Long Beach for the first half of their expansion season while The Forum was being completed.

In the 1970s, the arena hosted several games of the Los Angeles Sharks, of the WHA and regular appearances of the Los Angeles Thunderbirds roller derby team. The Grateful Dead played the arena on December 15, 1972; the first of 13 concerts there through 1988.

Elvis Presley performed two shows here on November 14 and 15, 1972. He returned for two more shows on April 25, 1976 (afternoon and evening).

In 1980–81, the arena was also home to the California Surf of the North American Soccer League for one season of indoor soccer.

The arena was home to the former Long Beach Ice Dogs team, which played professional ice hockey in the IHL, WCHL and ECHL. The Ice Dogs ceased operations of the team in 2007.

The Eagles performed during a benefit concert for California Senator Alan Cranston on July 31, 1980, on what has been described as "Long Night at Wrong Beach". Tempers boiled over as Glenn Frey and Don Felder spent the entire show telling each other about the beating each planned to administer backstage. "Only three more songs until I kick your ass, pal," Frey recalls Felder telling him near the end of the band's set. Felder recalls Frey making a similar threat to him during "Best of My Love". "We're out there singing ‘Best of My Love', but inside both of us are thinking, 'As soon as this is over, I'm gonna kill him,' " recalled Frey. The animosity purportedly developed as a result of Felder's response of "You're welcome – I guess" to Senator Cranston as he was thanking the band for doing the benefit for his reelection. A live recording of their song "Life in the Fast Lane" from this show was included on their live album, entitled Eagles Live. This marked their final live performance, as The Eagles, for 14 years, until April 25, 1994.

Iron Maiden performed four consecutive shows during their World Slavery Tour on March 14–17, 1985. The show on the 15th was recorded and released as a double live-album, entitled Live After Death.

The arena was also one of the sites of the 1986 and 1990 NCAA Men's Division I Basketball Championship Rounds of 64 and 32. The teams that played at the arena in 1986 included Maryland, Pepperdine & UNLV. Maryland's Len Bias played his final collegiate game at the arena on March 16, 1986, in a loss to UNLV in the Round of 32. In 1990, the Loyola Marymount Lions, an 11 seed, defeated New Mexico State and then trounced the 3 seed and defending champion Michigan Wolverines by 34 points on their way to an Elite 8 appearance, just days after the on-court death of their star player Hank Gathers in the West Coast Conference tournament. Teammate Bo Kimble (a right-handed player) famously shot his first free throw in each game left-handed as a tribute to Gathers. The arena was also the site of the Big West Conference men's basketball tournament from 1989 to 1993. It was the home court for Long Beach State's men's basketball team for several seasons in the 1970s and 1980s.

Run–D.M.C. performed during their Raising Hell Tour on August 17, 1986, with Whodini, LL Cool J, The Beastie Boys and The Timex Social Club as their opening acts. The show made news worldwide when gang fights broke out between the Long Beach-based Insane Crips and the Los Angeles-based Rollin 60's Crips within the audience, with 42 reported injuries during the incident.

Iron Maiden, Motörhead, Dio performed at Long Beach Arena on August 25, 2003.

From 2009 to 2016, the FIRST Robotics Competition Los Angeles Regional was held at the Long Beach Arena.

On July 1 and 2, 2017, the arena hosted New Japan Pro-Wrestling's G1 Special in USA shows, which marked the company's first independently promoted shows in the United States.

In October 2018, PFL 9, a mixed martial arts event was held at the arena.

During the COVID-19 pandemic in California, the Arena was converted into a medical facility but was never utilized.

The Fox game show Game of Talents is filmed at the arena.

The arena will also host handball during the 2028 Summer Olympics.

Wyland murals

Along the exterior wall of the drum-shaped Arena is "Planet Ocean", one of environmental artist Wyland's Whaling Walls, which was dedicated on July 9, 1992, and covers 116,000 square feet (11,000 m2). The mural depicts migratory gray whales and other aquatic life that can be found in the waters off Long Beach.

In celebration of Earth Day in 2009, Wyland touched up the existing Whaling Wall and added a large mural of the earth on the roof of the arena.

Meeting rooms
There are two ballrooms: the 20,456 square foot (1900 m2) Grand Ballroom (seating up to 2,100) and the 13,200 square foot (1300 m2) Promenade Ballroom (seating up to 1,400) plus 34 meeting rooms totaling 82,823 square feet (7695 m2).

The convention center and theatre part served as host of the fencing competitions during the 1984 Summer Olympics.

The convention center will again serve as an Olympic venue if sports climbing is an Olympic event at the 2028 Summer Olympics.

Recordings
The Long Beach Arena has been used to record part or all of several live concert albums and videos, including:

 Gerry in California, live EP by Gerry and the Pacemakers, 1965
 Billy J. Plays the States, live EP by Billy J. Kramer and the Dakotas, 1965
 Turn Around, Live Long Beach, Deep Purple, July 1971
 Closer To Queen Mary, album, The Who, December 10, 1971
 How the West Was Won album, Led Zeppelin, June 27, 1972
 Leon Live album, Leon Russell, August 28, 1972
 The Night the Light Went On in Long Beach album, Electric Light Orchestra, May, 1974
 Crossroads 2: Live in the Seventies album, Eric Clapton, July 19, 1974 & July 20, 1974
 King Biscuit Flower Hour Presents: Deep Purple in Concert album, Deep Purple, February 1976
 Boston - Live in Long Beach '77 album, Boston, December 1977
 Richard Pryor: Live in Concert, December 10, 1978
 St. Valentine's Day Rock & Roll Massacre: Hustler DVD re-issue, West Coast Sound, February 14, 1980
 Street Songs Deluxe Edition, Live CD by Rick James July 30, 1981
 Live After Death, Iron Maiden, March 15, 1985
Singer Bruce Dickinson orders the crowd several times throughout the show, "Scream for me, Long Beach!"
 Live...In the Raw album by W.A.S.P., March 10, 1987
 Psychedelic Sexfunk Live from Heaven video, Red Hot Chili Peppers, 1990
 Medusa: Dare to be Truthful TV special by Julie Brown mid-September 1991 (was also filmed at the Center Theater and Exhibition Hall)
 Rock Steady Live DVD by No Doubt 2002
 I Heard a Voice – Live from Long Beach Arena DVD by AFI December 12, 2006
 Louder Now:Partone and Louder Now:Parttwo, Taking Back Sunday live CD/DVD, 2006-2007
 Berth, The Used live CD/DVD combination, February 6, 2007
 Live in the LBC & Diamonds in the Rough, Avenged Sevenfold April 10, 2008
 Live in the LBC & Diamonds in the Rough DVD by Avenged Sevenfold 16 September 2008

See also
List of convention centers in the United States

References

External links

 

Convention centers in California
Indoor ice hockey venues in California
Convention and Entertainment Center
l
College basketball venues in the United States
Basketball venues in California
Defunct National Hockey League venues
Defunct indoor soccer venues in the United States
World Hockey Association venues
Mixed martial arts venues in California
Venues of the 1984 Summer Olympics
Venues of the 2028 Summer Olympics
Olympic fencing venues
Olympic handball venues
Tourist attractions in Long Beach, California
Volleyball venues in California
Olympic volleyball venues
North American Soccer League (1968–1984) indoor venues
Sports venues in Long Beach, California
Los Angeles Kings